Rickie O'Neal Winslow (born July 26, 1964) is an American former professional basketball player. He has a Turkish passport under the name Kartal Reşat Fırıncıoğlu. Winslow, who was selected by the Chicago Bulls, with the 28th overall pick, in the 2nd round of the 1987 NBA draft, played in seven NBA games, during the 1987–88 season, with the Milwaukee Bucks.

High school
Winslow played high school basketball at Yates High School in Houston, Texas. He was a teammate of Carven Holcombe.

College career
He continued his basketball career across the street at the University of Houston, where he played for four years, from 1983 to 1987, and he was one of the last "official" members of the famed Phi Slama Jama dunking fraternity.

Professional career
Winslow was selected by the Chicago Bulls, with the 28th overall pick, in the 2nd round of the 1987 NBA draft. He played in seven NBA games with the Milwaukee Bucks, during the 1987–88 season,

Winslow spent five years with the Spanish club CB Estudiantes, and with them he won the Spanish Cup, and made the semi-finals of the EuroLeague. He also played in Turkey, with Fenerbahçe, Efes Pilsen, and Türk Telekom.

Personal
He is the father of professional basketball player Justise Winslow.

References

External links 
 Career NBA stats @ basketball-reference.com

1964 births
Living people
American emigrants to Turkey
American expatriate basketball people in France
American expatriate basketball people in Italy
American expatriate basketball people in Spain
American expatriate basketball people in Turkey
American men's basketball players
Anadolu Efes S.K. players
Basketball players from Houston
CB Canarias players
CB Estudiantes players
CB Zaragoza players
Chicago Bulls draft picks
Élan Béarnais players
Fenerbahçe men's basketball players
Houston Cougars men's basketball players
Liga ACB players
Milwaukee Bucks players
Naturalized citizens of Turkey
Parade High School All-Americans (boys' basketball)
Shooting guards
Turkish men's basketball players
Turkish people of African-American descent
Türk Telekom B.K. players
Ülker G.S.K. basketball players